William Leonard, of Dover, Kent, was an English politician.

He was a Member of Parliament (MP) for Dover in 1597.

References

Year of birth missing
Year of death missing
Members of the Parliament of England for Dover
English MPs 1597–1598